Broken Down may refer to:

 Broken Down: The EP, a 2003 hard rock album
 Broken Down (Mest album), a 2014 album by Mest
 "Broken Down" (song), a 2003 song by alternative metal band Sevendust 
 "Empire State of Mind (Part II) Broken Down", a 2009 song by Alicia Keys
 "Broken Down", a 2001 song by Eric Clapton from Reptile

See also
 Breakdown (disambiguation)